Heartsdales was a Japanese-American hip pop duo composed of sisters  and , known by their stage names Rum and Jewels, respectively.

Yumi was born on December 17, 1981 and Emi on December 4, 1976 in Tokyo, Japan. Their family moved to the Yonkers area of New York right after Yumi was born, due to their father's job as an interior designer. In 1995, the family moved back to Japan, and Yumi attended Tama Art University and Emi attended Keio University.

In summer 2001, Yumi and Emi appeared on the TV audition program Asayan after sending in a demo. They won the competition, and landed a contract with Avex Entertainment. They adopted the name "Heartsdales" as a reference to the hamlet of Hartsdale, New York.

They released their first album, Radioactive, in 2002 under Avex Record's sublabel Cutting Edge. Their first single, "So Tell Me," was ranked 6th on the Oricon music rankings. Since then, they released 6 albums and 14 singles. Artimage is Heartsdales' management office, who also manages other Japanese hip-hop artists such as M-Flo and Double.

On June 22, 2006, Heartsdales announced on their official website that they were going to split up to pursue new endeavors.

Later career 
Yumi lives in New York City and has started a design studio, "Studio Yumi," and attended the Parsons The New School for Design completing the program in 2009."PROFILE: YUMI", studioyumi.com. Accessed May 20, 2022 

Emi lives in Tokyo.

Yumi announced on her blog that she gave birth to her son weighing  on June 25, 2010.

Discography

Albums

Remix albums

Singles

Collaborations / Compilations
 Woman - Keizo Nakanishi featuring Heartsdales (CD Album Idenshi - 07.30.2003)
 Helpless Game - Heartsdales Featuring Verbal and Mika Nakashima (CD Album Radioactive)
 Helpless Rain (But I'm Falling Too Deep Version) - Mika Nakashima Feat. Verbal and Heartsdales (CD Single Helpless Rain)
 Switch - Lisa featuring Kumi Koda & Heartsdales (CD Single Switch/I Only Want to Be with You)
 Switch - Lisa featuring Kumi Koda & Heartsdales (CD Album Gratitude)
 Wet N' Wild - Heartsdales featuring SUITE CHIC (CD Album Sugar Shine)
 Starstruck: "The Return of the LuvBytes" - M-Flo loves AI & Hinouchi Emi & Rum (Heartsdales) (CD Album Astromantic - 05.26.2004)
 It's a Small World - Kumi Koda & Heartsdales (Soundtrack 80 Days - 11.03.2004)
 It's a Small World - Kumi Koda & Heartsdales (CD Album secret (first press) - 02.09.2005)
 Oh Boy - Jhett featuring Heartsdales (CD Album Jhett a.k.a. Yakko for Aquarius - 03.24.2005)
 Push It (Compilation We Love Dance Classics Vol. 1 - 03.24.2005)
 Speedster - Three Nation feat. Heartsdales (CD Album Dance Floor Lovers - 3.15.2006)
 Player - Origa featuring Heartsdales (Soundtrack Ghost in the Shell: Stand Alone Complex - Solid State Society OP Song 11.22.2006)

References

External links
 
 
 

Women hip hop groups
Japanese hip hop groups
Japanese pop music groups
Avex Group artists
Hip hop duos
Sibling musical duos
Musical groups from Tokyo
Musical groups from New York City